Love's Shadow is an 1867 painting by Pre-Raphaelite artist Frederick Sandys. It was modeled by actress Mary Emma Jones, Sandys common-law wife. The figure is richly adorned and biting the blooms from some blue violets, which are a symbol of love and devotion in Victorian floriography.

References

1867 paintings
Paintings by Frederick Sandys